Stockhausen-Illfurth is an Ortsgemeinde – a community belonging to a Verbandsgemeinde – in the Westerwaldkreis in Rhineland-Palatinate, Germany.

Geography

The community lies in the Westerwald between Limburg und Siegen. Through the community flows the Große Nister. Stockhausen-Illfurth belongs to the Verbandsgemeinde of Bad Marienberg, a kind of collective municipality. Its seat is in the like-named town.

History
In 1438, Stockhausen-Illfurth had its first documentary mention.

Politics

The municipal council is made up of 8 council members who were elected in a majority vote in a municipal election on 13 June 2004.

Economy and infrastructure

North of the community runs Bundesstraße 414, leading from Hohenroth to Hachenburg. The nearest Autobahn interchange is Haiger/Burbach on the A 45 (Dortmund–Hanau), some 22 km away. The nearest InterCityExpress stop is the railway station at Montabaur on the Cologne-Frankfurt high-speed rail line.

References

External links
 Stockhausen-Illfurth in the collective municipality’s Web pages 

Municipalities in Rhineland-Palatinate
Westerwaldkreis